The Saturn Award for Best Comic-to-Film Motion Picture is one of the annual awards given by the American professional organization, the Academy of Science Fiction, Fantasy & Horror Films. The Saturn Awards, which are the oldest film-specialized awards to reward science fiction, fantasy, and horror achievements (the Hugo Award for Best Dramatic Presentation, awarded by the World Science Fiction Society who reward science fiction and fantasy in various media, is the oldest award for science fiction and fantasy films), included the category for the first time for the 2013 film year to specifically reward comic book adaptations in film, which were previously rewarded in categories such as Fantasy or Science Fiction.

Seven winners so far were produced by Marvel Studios and belong to the Marvel Cinematic Universe. Attack on Titan: Part 1 (2015) is the only nominee to be based on a manga.

Winners and nominees

2010s

2020s

References

External links
 The Official Saturn Awards Site
Saturn Awards on IMDb

Comic-to-Film Motion Picture